Shlomo Avineri (Hebrew: שלמה אבינרי) (born 1933 in Bielsko, Poland) is an Israeli political scientist. He is  Professor of Political Science at the Hebrew University of Jerusalem and member of the Israel Academy of Sciences and Humanities.
He also serves as  Recurring Visiting Professor at the Central European University in Budapest and Fellow of a Munich-based academic think tank offering advice to politicians.

Ideas
Avineri has written extensively in the history of political philosophy, especially on the political thought of Karl Marx, Georg Wilhelm Friedrich Hegel, and on the early Zionist political theories of Moses Hess and Theodor Herzl. He has also written numerous books and articles on Middle Eastern affairs and international affairs.

Avineri contributed in revising Hegel's political thought and showing Hegel's pluralism.

Avineri was also involved in the debate over the dissolution of the Soviet Union. He argued that it was the pre-capitalist structure of 1917 Russia, as well as the strong authoritarian traditions of the Russian state and its weak civil society, which pushed the Soviet revolution towards its repressive development.

His recent intellectual biography of Herzl shows how developments in his native Austro-Hungarian Empire, rather than the Dreyfus Affair in France, convinced Herzl of the failure of Jewish emancipation in Europe and of the need to find a political solution for the Jews, based on national self-determination, outside of Europe.

His work has appeared in Dissent, Foreign Affairs, and The New York Review of Books. He frequently contributes Op-eds to Haaretz.  He is a member of the Editorial Board of the Jewish Review of Books.

Positions held
He served as Director of Eshkol Research Institute (1971–74); Dean of Faculty of Social Sciences (1974–76); Director-General of the Ministry of Foreign Affairs (1976–77); and Director of the Institute for European Studies at the Hebrew University (1997–2002).

Avineri has had numerous visiting appointments including Yale University, Wesleyan University, Australian National University, Cornell University, University of California, The Queen's College, Oxford, Northwestern University, Cardozo School of Law,  and Oxford and, most recently, the University of Toronto.
He has been a visiting scholar at the Wilson Center, the Carnegie Endowment for International Peace, and Brookings Institution in Washington, DC, and at the Institute of World Economics and International Relations in Moscow.

He is currently Recurring Visiting Professor at the Central European University, in Budapest.

Avineri served as Director-General of Israel's Ministry of Foreign Affairs from 1975–77. He also headed the Israeli delegation to the UNESCO General Assembly, and in 1979 he was a member of the joint Egyptian-Israeli commission that negotiated the Cultural and Scientific Agreement between the two countries. When the Rabin government appointed Avineri to the post of Director-General of the Foreign Ministry in 1975, this was harshly criticized by the Likud opposition because of Avineri's support for negotiations with the PLO (a Likud MK even compared him  to "Lord Haw-Haw", the British traitor who had broadcast from Berlin during World War II and was later executed). During his time at the Foreign Ministry, Avineri followed the official line of the Rabin government preferring the "Jordanian Option" and participated in some of the meetings with King Hussein. But in his writings, and internal Foreign Ministry memoranda, he tried to present the conflict with the Palestinians within a wider context of a conflict between two national movements, beyond the narrow ideological or security-oriented conventional Israeli discourse. At that time, some of the first unofficial meetings between Israeli peace activists and PLO officials also took place. These developments were curtailed by the Likud electoral victory in 1977, which also led to Avineri's resignation from the Foreign Ministry, but were resumed in the 1990s in the second government of Rabin and led to the Oslo accords between Israel and the PLO.

Honors and awards
Avineri is the recipient of many honors and awards including:
 A British Council Scholarship (1961);
 The Rubin Prize in the Social Sciences (1968).
 The Naphtali Prize for the study of Hegel (1977).
 The Present Tense Award for the Study of Zionism (1982).
 The Israel Prize (1996), for political science.
 In 2006, he received the Israel Political Science Association Award for his contribution to the discipline in Israel and abroad.
 He holds a Ph.D. Honoris Causa from the University of Cluj-Napoca (Romania).
 In 2009, he received the Italian Solidarity Order of Merit (O.S.S.I), with the rank of "Commendatore", from Italian President Giorgio Napolitano
 In 2009, received the Solomon Bublick Award of the Hebrew University of Jerusalem.
 In 2010 he received a Ph.D.Honoris Causa from the Weizmann Institute, Rehovot.
 In 2011 he was elected to the Israel Academy of Sciences and Humanities.
 In 2013 he was elected to the Polish Academy of Arts and Sciences (PAU) and received the EMET Prize in Political Science.

Selected publications
The Social and Political Thought of Karl Marx (1968)
Karl Marx on Colonialism and Modernization (1968)
Israel and the Palestinians (1971)
Hegel's Theory of the Modern State (1972)
Marx's Socialism (1973)
Varieties of Marxism (1977)
The Making of Modern Zionism (1981)
Moses Hess: Prophet of Communism and Zionism (1985)
Arlosoroff: A Political Biography (1989)
Communitarianism and Individualism (co-editor with Avner de Shalit) (1992)
Europe's Century of Discontent (co-editor with Zeev Sternhell) (2003)
Moses Hess: The Holy History of Mankind & Other Writings (2004)
Herzl - Theodor Herzl and the Foundation of the Jewish State (2013)
Karl Marx: Philosophy and Revolution (2019)
Besides Hebrew and English editions of his books, they have been translated into French, German, Italian, Spanish, Portuguese, Polish, Hungarian, Czech, Russian and Japanese.

Editor and translator
Historical introduction to the Hebrew edition of Theodore Herzl's Diaries
Avineri also translated Karl Marx's Early Writings into Hebrew.

See also
List of Israel Prize recipients

References

External links 
 Carnegie Endowment Bio
 Needed: a paradigm shift in the 'Middle East Peace Process', Fathom: For a deeper understanding of Israel and the region, 30 January 2013

Israeli Jews
Academic staff of the Hebrew University of Jerusalem
Wesleyan University faculty
Members of the Israel Academy of Sciences and Humanities
Israel Prize in political science recipients
Israeli people of Polish-Jewish descent
People from Bielsko
1933 births
Living people
Israeli political scientists
Academic staff of Central European University
Solomon Bublick Award recipients
EMET Prize recipients in the Social Sciences
Polish emigrants to Mandatory Palestine